Ethiopia first participated at the Olympic Games in 1956, and has sent athletes to compete in every Summer Olympic Games since then, except for the 1976, 1984 and 1988 Games. Ethiopia also participated in the Winter Olympic Games for the first time at the 2006 Games in Turin.

Ethiopian athletes have won a total of 58 medals, all long-distance events in athletics.

Ethiopia's participation in the Olympic
s is organized by the Ethiopian Olympic Committee, founded in 1948 and recognized by the International Olympic Committee in 1954.

Medal tables

Medals by Summer Games

Medals by Winter Games

Medals by sport

List of medalists

Multiple medalists

See also
 List of flag bearers for Ethiopia at the Olympics
 :Category:Olympic competitors for Ethiopia
 Ethiopia at the Paralympics
 Tropical nations at the Winter Olympics

External links
 
 
 

 
Olympics